Pelecomalium is a genus of ocellate rove beetles in the family Staphylinidae. There are at least three described species in Pelecomalium.

Species
These three species belong to the genus Pelecomalium:
 Pelecomalium laevicolle (LeConte, 1866) g
 Pelecomalium puberulum (Fauvel, 1878) g
 Pelecomalium testaceum (Mannerheim, 1843) g
Data sources: i = ITIS, c = Catalogue of Life, g = GBIF, b = Bugguide.net

References

Further reading

External links

 

Omaliinae